Women's writing in Malayalam is a category of Malayalam literature that runs counter to the dominant public sphere in Kerala. It comprises women's fiction, poetry, and short stories and has a long tradition in Malayalam literature.  The pennezhuthu category is its most decisive and controversial form, changing the historiography of women's writing in India and the images of certain writers and writing trends.  Malayalam literature's most significant female authors are K. Saraswathi Amma, Rajalakshmi, Lalithambika Antharjanam and Madhavikutty (Kamala Das), best known for their narrating of "woman's space".  Women's literary writing in Malayala is part of a tradition of resistance and contributes to the women's cause through the merging of the public and the private spheres.  Women's writing emerged in India as a new subject of research and critical studies in the 1980s as a result of the feminist movement and as a consequence of growing interest in feminist historiography.

As a discursive practice, women's writing is among the wider cultural context of patriarchy and its structural manifestations. Despite the varying specificity of content under different modes of production, patriarchy can be described in terms of the dominance of the male and a corresponding marginalization of women.  Women's writing is important as a response to patriarchal relations within patriarchy itself. It may provide a unique record of the systems which shape and contain the life stories of women.

Women can identify women's writing as a struggle "which involves both dominant perceptions of social reality and the resistances to it".  In this sense, women's writings are significant documents in the analysis of women's spaces, which demonstrate the making and remaking of these spaces while recording their resistances to the outside world. Feminist historiography, while deconstructing dominant ways of writing women's history, considers women's writing itself to be history writing.

Two terms are used in relation to the subject: women-writing and women's writing.  Women's writing refers simply to writings by women.  Women-writing usually denotes the phenomenon of women's writing and its emergence as a new discipline within women's studies.

Women from most of the dominant communities, who had access to education, started writing by the second half of the 19th century. They wrote in journals and magazines in the late 19th century and early 20th century. Susie Tharu and Lalitha identify the period as "a high point of women's journalism and in almost every region, women edited journals for women and many hundreds of women wrote in them."  There were several magazines including Keraliya Suguna Bodhini (1886), Sarada (1904), Lakshmibai (1905), Mahilaratnam (1916), Mahila (1921), Sahodari (1925), Mahilamandiram (1927), Malayalam Anika (1931), and Street (1933) during this period, and journals for women from various communities.  Most of the journals carried articles written by women on issues such as health, education, child rearing, family, etc. All these writings, which basically followed the writings of some male reformers, reflected the attempt to create a model Malayali woman by mixing tradition and modernity in appropriate quantities.  These attempts could be viewed as early attempts at bringing "private" issues into "public" notice.  But the image that was being constructed across communities and identities consisted largely of an ideal middle class woman who was educated, homely and suitable for a modern educated man.

Jancy James notes that the shift from verse to prose in women's expression is related to women's education.  Women writers such as Lalithambika Antharjanam (1909−1985) and K. Saraswathi Amma (1919−1975) used prose efficiently and frequently, although there were writers such as Mary John Thottam or Sister Mary Benigna (1901−1985), Koothattukulam Mary John (1905−?), Kadathanattu Madhavi Amma (1909−1999), and Balamani Amma (1909−2004) who wrote in verse.  For most of these women writers, education functioned more as an indirect means of access to the public sphere than as a means merely to read and write. Unlike earlier women-writers who wrote in Sanskrit, women who had access to modern education expressed their own experiences in their own languages.

Malayalam-language literature
Women in India